is a private women's college in Hoshigaoka in Chikusa-ku, Nagoya, Japan, with a subsidiary campus in the city of Nisshin. The predecessor of the school was founded in 1905 as a sewing school, and it was chartered as a university in 1949.

Locally, it is famous as one of the "SSK" schools of Nagoya: Aichi Shukutoku University, Kinjo Gakuin University, and this university. It is close to Hoshigaoka Station on the municipal subway's Higashiyama Line.

External links
 Official website

References

Educational institutions established in 1905
Private universities and colleges in Japan
Women's universities and colleges in Japan
Universities and colleges in Nagoya
1905 establishments in Japan
Nisshin, Aichi